Greensky Bluegrass is a five-piece American bluegrass jam band founded in Kalamazoo, Michigan in mid-2000. The band has evolved over the years, growing from 3 to 5 members, adding electric effects, and touring with a full light show. Partly because of their name, many articles written about the band address the fact that what Greensky does is "not quite" bluegrass. In their own promotional material, GSBG describes their sound as "their own version of bluegrass music, mixing the acoustic stomp of a string band with the rule-breaking spirit of rock & roll".

Career
The band was formed in the fall of 2000 by Michael Arlen Bont (banjo), Dave Bruzza (guitar), and Paul Hoffman (mandolin), who initially played together at an open mic night. As newcomers to the bluegrass scene, the three drew upon an array of influences and varied musical backgrounds, reflected in their May 2004 release of Less than Supper, recorded with bassist Chris Carr and dobro player Al Bates. Both Bates and Carr left the band shortly thereafter. Classical cellist Michael Devol had approached Greensky with an offer to assist in management, but ended up joining the group as bassist in the fall of 2004.  The group describes their commendatory as more of a brotherhood than a band.

In the summer of 2006 the band were winners of the Telluride Bluegrass Festival Band Competition, earning them a spot on the main stage of the 2007 festival. Soon thereafter they released their second studio album, Tuesday Letter, produced by Tim Carbone of Railroad Earth.  They rounded out their line-up in 2007 when they added Dobroist Anders Beck.

On September 23, 2016 Greensky Bluegrass released their latest studio effort Shouted, Written Down & Quoted produced by Steve Berlin of Los Lobos and Co-Produced/Engineered, Mixed and Mastered by Glenn Brown. The bulk of this album was recorded in Asheville, North Carolina in October, 2015. Greensky Bluegrass continued touring, and on January 10, 2020, they released Courage for the Road: Fall 2019 (Live), the first part of two live albums released that year. They followed it with Courage for the Road: Winter 2020 (Live) in March 2020.
 On Jan 21st, 2022 they released the album "Stress Dreams" Produced, Recorded, Mixed and Mastered by Glenn Brown.

Collaborations 
On-stage collaborations have paired Greensky Bluegrass with:
 Phil Lesh
 Bill Kreutzmann & Papa Mali
 Cornmeal
 Larry Keel
 Railroad Earth
 Sam Bush
Billy Strings
Yonder Mountain String Band
Jon Fishman
 Holly Bowling
 Tom Hamilton

Discography

References

General references

 Kalamazoo Gazette

External links 
Official website
Facebook
Live collection at the Internet Archive

American bluegrass music groups
Musical groups established in 2000
Kalamazoo, Michigan
2000 establishments in Michigan